was a samurai of Japan's Sengoku period, and younger brother of Takeda Shingen. 
He was known as one of the "Twenty-Four Generals of Takeda Shingen".

Takeda Nobushige held the favor of their father, and was meant to inherit the Takeda lands, wealth and power, becoming head of the clan. However, Shingen rebelled against their father and seized the lands and power for himself.

Nobushige nevertheless fought alongside his brother who relied on him for support, He is famous not only for his strategic insight but also his wisdom; he wrote among other things Kyūjūkyū Kakun, a set of 99 short rules for Takeda clan members, some of which are erroneously attributed to Shingen himself from time to time.

He is also known as Takeda Tenkyū (Tenkyū being another rank he held).  Nobushige became an important Takeda general and led large forces on several occasions. In 1544, Shingen had a rebellion on his hands. As part of his punitive effort he sent Nobushige to capture Fujisawa Yorichika's Kōjinyama castle. (He probably succeeded, though sources differ). Katsurao castle, main castle of Murakami Yoshikiyo, fell to Nobushige and Takeda Yoshinobu in 1553. This drove Yoshikiyo to Uesugi Kenshin and was really the last significant act before the start of the Kawanakajima campaigns proper. It was in 4th battle of Kawanakajima, this last battle that Takeda Nobushige gave up his life.

Sanada Yukimura's initial name was, in fact, Sanada Nobushige, named after this very person.

In popular culture
Noritoshi Kashima portrayed Nobushige in NHK's 2006 Taiga drama.

Family
Father: Takeda Nobutora (1493-1574)
Brothers:
 Takematsu (1517-1523)
Takeda Shingen (1521-1573)
 Inuchiyo (1523-1529)
 Takeda Nobumoto
Takeda Nobukado (1529-1582)
 Matsuo Nobukore (ca. 1530s-1571)
 Takeda Souchi
Takeda Nobuzane (ca. 1530s-1575)
 Ichijō Nobutatsu (ca. 1539-1582)
Sisters:
 Joukei-in (1519-1550), married Imagawa Yoshimoto
 Nanshou-in (born 1520) married Anayama Nobutomo
 Nene (1528-1543) married Suwa Yorishige

References

External links 
  "Legendary Takeda's 24 Generals" at Yamanashi-kankou.jp
http://pozyu.hp.infoseek.co.jp/nobusige.htm
http://www.zephyr.dti.ne.jp/~bushi/siseki/nobusige-kubi.htm

1525 births
1561 deaths
Samurai
Japanese warriors killed in battle
Takeda clan